Thermoniphas albocaerulea is a butterfly in the family Lycaenidae. It is found in Uganda.

References

Endemic fauna of Uganda
Butterflies described in 1956
Thermoniphas